Hong Kong International Building and Decoration Materials & Hardware Fair is an annual trade show in Hong Kong. The show is organised by the Hong Kong Trade Development Council and the CIEC Exhibition Company (HK) Limited, held annually (usually in October) at the AsiaWorld-Expo, Hong Kong. This fair is positioned as a one-stop shop for all building, decoration and hardware needs, with a wide range of products and services on offer from exhibitors. Regular exhibit categories reflect both the needs of the market and the growing interest in do-it-yourself (DIY) products for interior decoration.

Major exhibit categories 
 Bathroom & Kitchen 
 Building & Decorative Hardware 
 Building Technology 
 Ceiling and Curtain Wall 
 Ceramics, Stone & Marble 
 Coating & Chemicals 
 Door & Window 
 Furniture 
 Indoor Decorative Materials

References

External links 
 Hong Kong International Building and Decoration Materials & Hardware Fair

Building materials companies of China
Trade fairs in Hong Kong